Sergei Mark Kosorotov (born 16 June 1999) is a Russian handball player for Wisła Płock   and the Russian national team.

He represented Russia at the 2019 World Men's Handball Championship.

Honours
 EHF European League: Bronze medalist 2022
 Polish Cup: 2022
 Russian Handball Super League: 2018, 2019, 2020, 2021
 Russian Cup: 2018, 2019, 2020, 2021

References

External links

1999 births
Living people
Russian male handball players
Sportspeople from Moscow
Wisła Płock (handball) players